Tarun (also Romanized as Ţārūn and Tārūn; also known as Ţārān and Ţārom) is a village in Kandovan Rural District, Kandovan District, Meyaneh County, East Azerbaijan Province, Iran. At the 2006 census, its population was 299, in 79 families.

References 

Populated places in Meyaneh County